The 2017–18 season was Manchester City's 116th season of competitive football, 89th season in the top flight of English football and 21st season in the Premier League. In addition to the league, the club also competed in the FA Cup, EFL Cup and UEFA Champions League.

City won their third Premier League title on 15 April 2018, following West Bromwich Albion's 1–0 away win over second-placed Manchester United, and the EFL Cup on 25 February 2018 with a 3–0 win over Arsenal, the latter being Pep Guardiola's first trophy at City.

The team set a number of Premier League records during the season, including: most points (100), most away points (50), most points ahead of second (19), most wins (32), most away wins (16), most goals (106), best goal difference (+79) and most consecutive victories (18). The team also equalled the record for the earliest Premier League title win (5 games to spare), beating every other team in the league throughout the season, and recording the most consecutive away wins (11). As a result of City setting an English top flight record for most points in a single season (100), the team received the nickname "Centurions", and have been acclaimed by pundits and football journalists as being one of the greatest teams in Premier League history.

Kits
Supplier: Nike / Sponsor: Etihad Airways

Season review
On 1 November, Sergio Agüero scored his 178th City goal in a 4–2 Champions League away victory over Napoli to become the club's all-time leading goalscorer, surpassing the former highest total set by Eric Brook.

On 25 February, City won their first silverware of the Guardiola era, defeating Arsenal 3–0 at Wembley Stadium to win the 2017–18 EFL Cup.

On 15 April, City were confirmed as Premier League champions following Manchester United's 0–1 home defeat to West Bromwich Albion. This was the club's third Premier League title and fifth English top flight title and also completed their second league and League Cup double in four years.

City broke and set several new club and English football records during their 2017–18 campaign:

 New national records for consecutive away (11) and overall victories (20) in all competitions; and for consecutive league wins (18)
 New Premier League records for most points (100); most goals scored (106); total wins achieved (32) in a single season; largest winning margin (19 pts); largest goal difference (+79); away games won in a season (16); away points won in a season (50 pts); and the youngest ever Premier League winner (Phil Foden, aged 17 years and 350 days)
 Equalled the Premier League record for consecutive away league wins (11)
 New club records for consecutive games unbeaten in all competitions (28); consecutive games unbeaten in the league (30); consecutive home wins in all competitions (20); and fewest goals conceded in a fully played season (non-war) (27)

The 2017–18 season was an undoubted success for the Blues domestically, but their European campaign was quite underwhelming. The team confidently won five games at the group stage and qualified for the knockout stage, where it defeated FC Basel. The Cityzens were drawn with fellow Premier League side Liverpool in the quarter-finals. The outcome of those games was a disappointing result as Manchester City were beaten 5–1 on aggregate and eliminated amid the controversy with refereeing mistakes favourable to Liverpool.

An Amazon Original docuseries of the season titled All or Nothing: Manchester City was released on Amazon Video on 17 August 2018.

Pre-season and friendlies
On 16 May 2017, Manchester City announced they would face Manchester United as part of the 2017 International Champions Cup. Matches against Tottenham Hotspur and Real Madrid were also confirmed as part of the same tournament. A standalone pre-season friendly against West Ham United then took place in Iceland. A friendly was also scheduled against partner club Girona to take place after the first match of the Premier League season.

International Champions Cup

Super Match

Costa Brava Trophy

Competitions

Premier League

League table

Results summary

Results by matchday

Matches
On 14 June 2017, Manchester City's Premier League fixtures were announced.

FA Cup

Manchester City entered the competition in the third round and were drawn at home to Burnley. They were handed an away tie against Cardiff City in the fourth round proper. In the fifth round, City were drawn away to Wigan Athletic.

EFL Cup

Manchester City entered the competition in the third round and were drawn away to West Bromwich Albion. A home tie against Wolverhampton Wanderers was confirmed for the fourth round. The Blues were handed an away tie against Leicester City in the quarter-finals. In the two-legged semi-finals, they were drawn against Bristol City as the home team, thus hosting the first leg and playing the second one on the road at Bristol.

UEFA Champions League

On 24 August 2017, Manchester City were drawn into Group F alongside Shakhtar Donetsk, Napoli and Feyenoord. The Blues topped their group and were then paired with Basel from the Swiss Super League in round of 16 two-legged tie.

Group stage

Notes

Knockout phase

Round of 16

Quarter-finals

Squad information

First team squad

 
Ordered by squad number.
Appearances include league and cup appearances, including as substitute.
Ages are as at the end of the 2017–18 season.

Statistics

Squad statistics

Appearances (Apps) numbers are for appearances in competitive games only, including sub appearances.
Red card numbers denote: numbers in parentheses represent red cards overturned for wrongful dismissal.

Goalscorers

Includes all competitive matches. The list is sorted alphabetically by surname when total goals are equal.

Clean sheets

The list is sorted by shirt number when total clean sheets are equal. Numbers in parentheses represent games where both goalkeepers participated and both kept a clean sheet; the number in parentheses is awarded to the goalkeeper who was substituted on, whilst a full clean sheet is awarded to the goalkeeper who was on the field at the start of play.

Awards

Etihad Player of the Month

Premier League Player of the Month

Premier League Manager of the Month
In December 2017, Pep Guardiola became the first manager in Premier League history to be awarded four consecutive Manager of the Month awards.

UEFA Team of the Year

BBC Young Sports Personality of the Year

Won the Golden Ball as the best player at the FIFA U-17 World Cup, helping England win the tournament.

Alan Hardaker Trophy

Awarded to the player of the match in the EFL Cup final.

PFA Team of the Year

PFA Young Player of the Year

Premier League Playmaker of the Season
Inaugural award to the Premier League player with the most league assists in the season.

Premier League Manager of the Season

LMA Manager of the Year

Etihad Player of the Season
Manchester City's player of the season.

Transfers and loans

Transfers in

Transfers out

Loans out

Overall transfer activity

Expenditure
Summer:  £210,350,000

Winter:  £57,000,000

Total:  £267,350,000

Income
Summer:  £68,240,000

Winter: £0

Total:  £68,240,000

Net totals
Summer:  £142,110,000

Winter:  £57,000,000

Total:  £199,110,000

References

External links
 

Manchester City F.C. seasons
Manchester City
Manchester City
English football championship-winning seasons